Dost Muhammad Rahimoon (born 1 February 1976) is son of Jumoon Khan Rahimoon and Nephew of ex-minister Inaulyatullah Rahimoon. He is a Pakistani politician who had been a Member of the Provincial Assembly of Sindh, from May 2013 to May 2018.

Early life and education
He was born on 1 February 1976 in Chachro.

He is from a village near Umerkot (70 km away) Namely "Mehran Vero". 

He has graduated from Degree College in Umerkot.

Political career

He ran for the seat of the Provincial Assembly of Sindh as a candidate of Pakistan Peoples Party (PPP) from Constituency PS-63 (Tharparkar-IV) in 2008 Pakistani general election but was unsuccessful. He received 19,771 votes and lost the seat to Abdul Razzaque Rahimoon.

He was elected to the Provincial Assembly of Sindh as a candidate of PPP from Constituency PS-63 (Tharparkar-IV) in 2013 Pakistani general election. He received 29,072 votes and defeated Ghulam Hyder Samejo.

References

Living people
Sindh MPAs 2013–2018
1976 births
Pakistan People's Party politicians